Olivier Sibony (born 1967) is a French consultant, academic, and author known for his contributions to behavioral strategy and for his work on the impact of heuristics and biases on strategic decision-making and procedures to enhance the quality of decisions. He is the author of several popular books and the co-author of the New York Times best-seller Noise: A Flaw in Human Judgment, with Daniel Kahneman and Cass R. Sunstein.

Sibony is Professor of strategy and management at HEC Paris, where he received the Vernimmen Prize for teaching excellence in 2020. He is also affiliated with Saïd Business School at Oxford University as an Associate Fellow.

Early life and education 
Olivier Sibony was born in 1967 in Paris, France. After his Baccalauréat at Lycée Louis-Le-Grand and classes préparatoires at Lycée Carnot, he attended HEC Paris, graduating in 1988.

In 2017, Sibony defended his Ph.D. thesis at Université Paris Dauphine under the supervision of Professor Stéphanie Dameron. His topic was “Understanding and preventing error in strategic decision processes: the contribution of behavioral strategy”.

Career 
From 1991 to 2015, Olivier Sibony worked at of McKinsey&Company, where he was elected partner in 1997 and senior partner in 2004. His client work focused on strategy and growth in the consumer, retail, and luxury sectors. During his tenure, he served as a Partner and Director in the Paris, New York, and Brussels offices of the firm.

In 2015, Sibony joined the faculty of HEC Paris where he is currently Professor (Education Track) in the Strategy department. Sibony is also an Associate Fellow of Said Business School at Oxford University.

Research 
Sibony’s research interests center on applying insights from judgment and decision-making to strategy, a field he was among the first to name “Behavioral Strategy.” He has written extensively about the effect of cognitive biases on strategic decisions and explored ways to identify and mitigate biases. Through his research and practice, Sibony has developed procedures to improve the quality of decisions. He has written numerous articles and case studies on these topics, which have been published in leading business publications such as Harvard Business Review, Sloan Management Review, California Management Review, and McKinsey Quarterly.

Distinctions 
Since 2017, Sibony holds the title of Knight in the Legion of Honor, one of the highest French awards for contributions to French society.

Selected publications

Books       

 Kahneman, D., Sibony, O. & Sunstein, C. (2021). Noise. A Flaw in Human Judgement. New York: Little Brown Spark. 
 Sibony, O. (2020). You're About to Make a Terrible Mistake: How Biases Distort Decision-Making and What You Can Do to Fight Them. New York: Little, Brown Spark.
 Garrette, B., Phelps, C. & Sibony, O. (2018). Cracked it!: How to solve big problems and sell solutions like top strategy consultants. Cham/ Switzerland: Springer International Publishing. DOI: 10.1007/978-3-319-89375-4_1.
 French : (2021) Trouvez-moi la solution ! Les méthodes de résolution de problèmes des meilleurs consultants en stratégie. Paris : Flammarion (Clés des Champs).
 Sibony, O. (2020). Vous allez redécouvrir le management ! 40 clés scientifiques pour prendre de meilleures décisions. Paris : Flammarion.
 Garrette, B., Lehmann-Ortega, L., Leroy, F., Dussauge. P., Durand, R., Pointeau, B. & Sibony, O. (2019). STRATEGOR. Toute la stratégie de la start-up à la multinationale (Livres en Or, 8th ed)

Articles in popular press 

 Kahneman, D., Sibony, O. & Sunstein, C. (18 May 2021). For a Fairer World, It’s Necessary First to Cut Through the ‘Noise’. New York Times.
 Sibony, O. (25 April 2020). « Experts, décideurs ou simples observateurs, nous sommes tous affectés par des biais cognitifs ». Le Monde. 
 Sibony, O. (19 March 2020, mise à jour 20 April 2020). Comment avons-nous pu nous aveugler à ce point ? Ces biais qui ont retardé la prise de conscience face au virus. Philonomist.

References 

Living people
1967 births
French consultants
French academics

HEC Paris alumni
French writers
Bestselling case authors
McKinsey & Company people